Fuel Cell and Hydrogen Energy Association (FCHEA) was formed in November 2010 following the merger of two former associations representing different sectors of the industry, the U.S. Fuel Cell Council and the National Hydrogen Association. FCHEA has more than sixty organizations as members. The Association's history dates back to 1989 through the creation of NHA.

Merger

In order to continue to advance and promote the use of fuel cell and hydrogen energy technologies, the U.S. Fuel Cell Council (USFCC) and the National Hydrogen Association (NHA) are teaming up. This merger of two leaders in two given industries creates a powerful, unified Fuel Cell and Hydrogen Energy Association (FCHEA), a company who plans to send a strong, singular message to stakeholders: fuel cells and hydrogen are incredibly important parts to producing clean energy. The new organization is based out of Washington, D.C.

References

Hydrogen economy organizations